Gur Aryeh or variant may refer to:

 Gur Aryeh al haTorah, a rabbinic commentary by Rabbi Judah Loew ben Bezalel
 Kollel Gur Aryeh, the graduate rabbinical school of Yeshiva Rabbi Chaim Berlin in Brooklyn, New York

People with the surname
Shemaryahu Gurary or Shemaryahu Gur-Aryeh (1898–1989), Orthodox Rabbi
Barry Gurary or Sholom Dovber Gur-Aryeh (1923–2005), Orthodox Rabbi and Physicist

See also
 Anna Gourari (born 1972), classical pianist

Hebrew-language surnames